Josef Thaler is an Austrian luger who competed in the 1950s. He won two medals at the inaugural event at the FIL World Luge Championships in Oslo in 1955 with a gold in the men's doubles and a silver in the men's singles events.

Thaler also won a bronze medal in the men's doubles event at the 1956 European luge championships in Imst, Austria.

References

List of European luge champions 

Austrian male lugers
Possibly living people
Year of birth missing